Abisai Shiningayamwe (born 16 May 1978) is a Namibian former footballer who played as a goalkeeper.

Career
Shiningayamwe is a permanent resident of South Africa and plays for ABSA Premier League side Jomo Cosmos.

Shiningayamwe played in Namibia's first group stage match of the 2008 African Nations Cup finals, a 5–1 loss to Morocco.

References

1978 births
Living people
Sportspeople from Walvis Bay
Namibian men's footballers
Namibia international footballers
Association football goalkeepers
Blue Waters F.C. players
F.C. Civics Windhoek players
Jomo Cosmos F.C. players
Orlando Pirates S.C. players
Namibia Premier League players
South African Premier Division players
2008 Africa Cup of Nations players
Namibian expatriate footballers
Expatriate soccer players in South Africa
Namibian expatriate sportspeople in South Africa